Allopentarthrum elumbe is a widespread species of true weevil that is found from Hawaii, Colombia, French Guiana, the Galápagos Islands, the West Indies, Ascension Island, Africa, Madagascar, Malaysia, Japan, Papua New Guinea, Lord Howe Island and Samoa. It inhabits tropical forest habitats across its range.

References

Cossoninae
Beetles described in 1838